Deval is a given name, a surname, Gotra of varied origins (Indian and French). It may refer to:

Surname
Chandra Prakash Deval (born 1949), Indian poet and translator
Charles Deval (1806–1862), French ophthalmologist 
Govind Ballal Deval (1855–1916), Indian playwright 
Jacques Deval (1895–1972), French screenwriter and director
Marguerite Deval (1866–1955), French singer and actress
Pierre Deval (1897–1993), French painter 
Pierre Deval (diplomat) (1758–1829), French diplomat
Narayan Singh Dewal (born 1964), Indian politician

Given name
Deval Eminovski (born 1964), Swedish football player
Deval Patrick (born 1956), American politician

See also

Devol (Albania), a former fortress in Albania
Devall (disambiguation)
Devall (surname)
Duval (surname)
Duvall (surname)

French-language surnames